Jevon Holland (born March 3, 2000) is an American football safety for the Miami Dolphins of the National Football League (NFL). He played college football at Oregon, and was drafted by the Dolphins in the second round of the 2021 NFL Draft.

Early years
Holland was born in Coquitlam, British Columbia, while his father played and coached in the Canadian Football League.  Holland moved to the Bay Area and lived in Pleasanton, California. Holland attended Bishop O'Dowd High School in Oakland, California. He played defensive back and wide receiver in high school. As a senior he had 34 tackles and five interceptions on defense and 35 receptions for 1,012 yards and 12 touchdowns as a receiver. Holland played in the 2018 Polynesian Bowl. He committed to the University of Oregon to play college football.

College career
As a true freshman at Oregon in 2018, Holland played in 13 games and made two starts. For the season he had 42 tackles and a team-high five interceptions. As a sophomore in 2019, he became a starter and started all 14 games. He again led the team with four interceptions and had 66 tackles and a touchdown.

On September 26, 2020, Holland announced that he has opted out of the 2020-21 college football season and has declared for the 2021 NFL Draft.

Professional career

Holland was selected in the second round (36th overall) by the Miami Dolphins; he was the first safety selected.  Though eligible and ranked as the #3 Canadian prospect, he was not selected in the subsequent 2021 CFL Draft. Holland signed his four-year rookie contract with Miami on July 23, 2021. As a rookie, he appeared in 16 games, of which he started 13. He had 2.5 sacks, 69 total tackles, two interceptions, and ten passes defensed. He was named to the 2021 PFWA All-Rookie Team. In the 2022 season, he started in all 17 games. He had 1.5 sacks, 96 total tackles, two interceptions, seven passes defended, and one forced fumble.

NFL career statistics

References

External links

Miami Dolphins bio
Oregon Ducks bio

2000 births
Living people
Players of American football from Oakland, California
American football safeties
Oregon Ducks football players
Black Canadian players of American football
Sportspeople from British Columbia
People from Coquitlam
Miami Dolphins players